Malmeomyces is a genus of fungi within the Niessliaceae family. This is a monotypic genus, containing the single species Malmeomyces pulchellus .
 
The genus name of Malmeomyces is in honour of Gustaf Oskar Andersson Malme (1864-1937), who was a Swedish botanist.

The genus was circumscribed by Karl Starbäck in Bih. Kongl. Svenska Vetensk.-Akad. Handl. vol.25 (Afd.
3,1): [3]-4, 32 in 1899.

References

External links
Malmeomyces at Index Fungorum

Niessliaceae
Monotypic Sordariomycetes genera